Suzanne Sarroca (born 21 April 1927) is a 20th-century French operatic soprano.

Biography 
She began her career as a mezzo-soprano in the role of Charlotte in Massenet's Werther in Carcassonne, a role she revived the same year at the Capitole de Toulouse. In 1951 she sang Bizet's Carmen at la Monnaie of Brussels.

She then addressed the great roles of lyrico-dramatic soprano: in 1952, she made a remarkable debut at the Paris Opera where she sang at both the Opéra Garnier and the Opéra-Comique:

Rezia in Weber's Oberon
Senta in Wagner's The Flying Dutchman
Santuzza in Mascagni's Cavalleria rusticana
the title role of Verdi's Aida
Musetta in Puccini's La Bohème
Elisabeth in Verdi's Don Carlos.

She created Henry Barraud's Numance, interpreted the title role of Charpentier's Louise, Blanche de la Force in Poulenc's Le Dialogue des Carmélites, Tatiana in Tchaikovsky's Eugene Onegin, and also Octavian in Strauss's Rosenkavalier alongside Régine Crespin or Elisabeth Schwarzkopf.

For more than thirty years, she has been active in the major theatres of the provinces: Toulouse, Strasbourg, Marseille (Donna Anna in Don Giovanni, 1956), Bordeaux and Nice (Tosca with Franco Corelli in 1970).

Especially sought abroad for her embodiments of Puccini's Tosca, and Verdi's Aida and Elisabeth in Don Carlos, she triumphed in these roles in Buenos Aires, Brussels, Geneva, Rome, Rio, Naples, London (Covent Garden in 1958-59 and 1964–65).

Starting in the 1980s, she again took on certain mezzo roles, notably Mère Marie de l'Incarnation in  Dialogues des Carmélites in Strasbourg in 1982.

She was the director of the Atelier lyrique of the Opéra national du Rhin (1983-1985) and teacher at the 9th arrondissement of Paris conservatory until 1992.

She last lives and teaches in Paris.

She also can be heard in excerpts form Cavalleria Rusticana (role of Santuzza) with Alain Vanzo, Giulietta in Offenbach's Tales of Hoffmann published at Adès. She also recorded Tosca in French with Gustave Botiaux and Adrien Legros. Another testimony of this role exists in LP at London with José Luccioni. Her interpretation of Balkis in Gounod's La Reine de Saba alongside Gilbert Py and Gérard Serkoyan (Toulouse, 1970) is available at Gala. In the volume devoted to the French song of the Encyclopedia on CD-ROM by Richters (available at imagemogul and houseofopera), she can be heard in her complete incarnations of Salome in Massenet's Hérodiade (1963) and Elisabeth in Don Carlos (1968 French version in 5 acts). Her interpretation of Rachel in Halévy's La Juive in a concert at Carnegie Hall with Richard Tucker and Norman Treigle in 1964 has been briefly available on CD and in large excerpts from Monna Vanna by Henry Fevrier

References

External links 
 SUZANNE SARROCA La reine de Saba Plus grand, dans son obscurité concert on 13 May 1958 on YouTube
 Suzanne Sarroca

French operatic sopranos
French music educators
1927 births
People from Carcassonne
Possibly living people